Tandem is a language exchange app on iOS and Android that connects language learners with native speakers. Members can search for language exchange partners to talk to by either text or voice chat. As of July 2020, the app supports 300 languages including 20 sign languages, 20 indigenous languages, and six fictional ones such as Mandalorian or Klingon.

History 

Tandem was founded in Hannover in 2014 by Arnd Aschentrup, Tobias Dickmeis, and Matthias Kleimann. Now headquartered in Berlin, Tandem launched its mobile app on iOS in 2015, followed by Android in 2016. Prior to Tandem, Aschentrup, Dickmeis, and Kleimann founded Vive, a members-only mobile video chat community.

In 2015, Tandem closed a seed round of €600,000 from angel investors, including Atlantic Labs (Christophe Maire), Hannover Beteiligungsfonds, Marcus Englert (Chairman Rocket Internet), Catagonia, Ludwig zu Salm, Florian Langenscheidt, Heiko Hubertz, Martin Sinner, and Zehden Enterprises. In 2016, an additional €2m was raised from new investors, Rubylight and Faber Ventures, as well as existing investors Hannover Beteiligungsfonds, Atlantic Labs, and Zehden Enterprises.

In 2018, Tandem introduced Tandem Pro, a subscription-based offering to access all the language learning features available on the app.

In July 2020, Tandem closed a €5 million (~$5.7 million) Series A funding round led by Brighteye Ventures, a European education technology fund - along with Trind Ventures, Rubylight Limited, and GPS Ventures.

Concept 

The Tandem app and its name were inspired by Tandem language learning, a method of learning a language through language exchange. In a language exchange or a tandem, each person is a native speaker of the language the other person wants to learn. The discussion is divided equally between both languages to ensure both partners are able to learn their target language. The Tandem app is supported by Tandem Fundazioa, the organization that developed the tandem language learning method.

Features 
Tandem requires its members to submit an application before being accepted into the Tandem community. As part of Tandem’s moderation policy, each application is individually reviewed. 

Once accepted, Tandem presents its members with a stream of potential Tandem partners who are native speakers in the language they want to learn. Members can then chat with their Tandem partners via instant messaging, voice messages, audio calls, and video calls. The list of partners can also be refined using location, age and gender filters.

Reception 

In 2015, Tandem was named in Apple’s “Best Apps of 2015”. Tandem was also recognized as one of Google Play’s “Best Apps of 2017”.

Awards 
In 2018, Tandem received an award from the German initiative Deutschland - Land der Ideen in their  “Ausgezeichnete Orte im Land der Ideen” competition. This initiative recognizes the top ideas and projects in Germany that encourage the interconnection of cultures and an open-minded society.

Criticism 

Tandem has received criticism for not accepting members into the community immediately. In some countries, there is a waiting list and applicants can wait up to 7 days for their application to be processed by the human moderators. On the other end, users have noticed Tandem does not let its users sign in if they never signed out before exiting the app. Thus causing many users to be permanently locked out of their fully set up account.

Languages Available on Tandem 
There are 300 languages available to learn on Tandem. The most popular language pairs (in order of popularity) are: English – Spanish, Spanish – Portuguese, English – Chinese, English – French, and Chinese – Japanese.

References 

Language-learning websites
Mobile applications
Proprietary language learning software
Android (operating system) software